The 2019–20 Major Arena Soccer League season is the twelfth season for the league. The league adopted a new format during the offseason, merging the four divisions into two conferences and eliminating the divisional format. On 12 March 2020, the league announced they would end the regular season early due to the COVID-19 pandemic outbreak. On July 1, 2020, MASL announced that the Board of Directors had voted to conclude the 2019–20 season with the recognition of the Monterrey Flash and Florida Tropics being the winners of the Western and Eastern Conferences, respectively.

Changes from 2018-19
Expansion
Mesquite Outlaws

Folded
Mississauga MetroStars

Moved to MASL 2
El Paso Coyotes
RGV Barracudas FC

Returning
Sonora Suns
Rochester Lancers

Change in season format
On July 19, 2019, the MASL announced the following changes for the 2019–20 season.
Teams will be divided into two conferences (Eastern and Western), rather than four divisions.
All playoff matchups will follow the best of three format, with the third game being a mini-game following game #2, if the series is tied.

Standings
As of March 12, 2020

(Bold) Division Winner
(Italic) Defending Champion
o-Eliminated from playoffs x-clinched playoff spot

Eastern Conference

Tiebreakers are as follows: Win%, Head to Head, Goal Differential, Wins, Losses.

Western Conference

Tiebreakers are as follows: Win%, Head to Head, Goal Differential, Wins, Losses

Statistics

Top scorers

Playoffs
Top 4 teams from both conferences qualify. Teams seeded 1st get to choose which lower seeded opponent from their conference they will face in the opening round. All rounds of the playoffs, including the championship finals, are best 2 of 3, with the 3rd game being a 15-minute mini-game, if required.
On May 21, MASL announced that it intends on having playoffs, with modifications such as one centralized location, and a five-day training camp period. However, on June 3, MASL announced that the plan from May 21 was no longer being implemented, due to logistical difficulties as well as any positives being outweighed by the negatives. With the announcement of the Flash and Tropics winning their conferences, the 2020 season concluded with no playoffs.

End-of-season awards
MASL announced their end of season awards schedule would start on the 8th of April with the All-MASL Honorable Mentions team and culminate on the 18th of April with the MVP award.

References

 
Major Arena Soccer League seasons
Major
Major